Changsha Social Work Technical College is a technical college located in Changsha, Hunan, China. It is established in 1984.

The college became one of the first one to launch a senior care program in China in 1999.

The US-based Radio Free Asia reported a student who tried to blow the whistle on what he called his illegal detention and torture at the hands of campus security guards has been denied permission to finish his education for "political" reasons by Changsha Social Work Technical College

References

External links
Official Website 

Universities and colleges in Hunan
Educational institutions established in 1984
Education in Changsha
1984 establishments in China
Universities and colleges in Changsha